Talk show is a type of radio or television programme.

Talk show may also refer to:

 Talk Show (The Go-Go's album)
 Talk Show (Shae Jones album)
 Talk Show (Talk Show album)
 Talk Show (band), an American rock band 
 "Talk Show" (Entourage), an Entourage episode
 Talkshow with Spike Feresten, a TV program

See also
The Talk (disambiguation)
The Show (disambiguation)
The Talk Show (disambiguation)
List of talk show hosts